Alpine skiing is a Paralympic sport that is contested at the Winter Paralympic Games. The first Winter Paralympics, held in 1976 in Örnsköldsvik, included slalom, giant slalom and alpine combination.

Since the 2006 Winter Games in Torino, a three category system is used. The three categories are: sitting, standing and visually impaired.

At the 2010 Winter Paralympics, events for both men and women were held in five disciplines: downhill (since 1984), slalom, giant slalom, super giant slalom (super-G) (since 1992), and combined.

A total of 484 gold medals, 476 silver medals and 464 bronze medals have been awarded since 1976 and have been won by skiers from 26 National Paralympic Committees (NPC).



Men

Downhill

Slalom

Giant slalom

Super-G

Combined

Women

Downhill

Slalom

Giant slalom

Super-G

Combined

Statistics

Athlete medal leaders

Medals per year
Key
bolded numbers indicate the highest medal count at that year's Paralympic Games.

Medal sweep events
These are events where athletes from one nation won all three medals.

See also
 List of Olympic medalists in alpine skiing
 Lists of Paralympic medalists

References
General
 
 1976 1980 1984 1988 1992 1994 1998 2002 20062010

Specific

External links
 IPC Historical Results Database, International Paralympic Committee (IPC)

Alpine skiing
Medalists
Alpine skiing
Alpine skiing